Antaeotricha chalinophanes is a moth in the family Depressariidae. It was described by Edward Meyrick in 1931. It is found in Bolivia.

References

Moths described in 1931
chalinophanes
Taxa named by Edward Meyrick
Moths of South America